The 2022–23 season is the 114th season in the existence of Huddersfield Town A.F.C. and the club's fourth consecutive season in the EFL Championship. In addition to the league, they will also compete in the 2022–23 FA Cup and the 2022–23 EFL Cup.

Carlos Corberán resigned as Head Coach on 7 July, just 22 days before the start of the season, with Danny Schofield replacing him as the new Head Coach, but he was relieved of his duties on 14 September 2022, following a run of 1 win in their opening 8 league games. He would be replaced two weeks later by Hertha BSC assistant coach Mark Fotheringham, who signed a deal until June 2025 with the Terriers, but he was sacked on 8 February 2023, following a poor run of form. Neil Warnock would return to manage the Terriers 30 years after originally being appointed as their manager, signing a short-term contract on 13 February, and officially taking charge 3 days later.

First-team squad
As of 18 March 2023.

Transfers

Transfers in

Loans in

Loans out

Transfers out

Pre-season and friendlies
On 8 June, Huddersfield announced two pre-season friendlies, against Bolton Wanderers and Harrogate Town. Two days later, a trip to Doncaster Rovers was confirmed. A behind closed doors friendly at the Canalside Training Ground was announced against Morecambe.

During the mid-season winter break, Town visited Marbella for a training camp, where they would face Olympiacos in a friendly.

First Team friendlies

B Team friendlies

Competitions

Overall record

Championship

League table

Results summary

Results by round

Matches
The league fixtures were announced on 23 June 2022. Town's first fixture will be a Sky Sports televised game against newly-relegated Burnley.

FA Cup

Huddersfield entered the competition in the third round and were drawn away to Preston North End.

EFL Cup

The first round of the EFL Cup was drawn on 23 June 2022 by Clinton Morrison and Michael Dawson.

Squad statistics

Awards

Huddersfield Town Blue & White Player of the Month Award
Awarded monthly to the player that was chosen by members of the Blue & White Members voting on htafc.com

References

Huddersfield Town
Huddersfield Town A.F.C. seasons